Kegalu Balika Vidyalaya is a national Buddhist girls' school in Kegalle, Sri Lanka.

The school, the Kegalu Buddhist English Ladies College, was established in 1943 by the Parama Vignanartha Buddhist Association, in response to the prevailing English missionary school system. It was the first Buddhist girls’ school in the Kegalle District. The initial enrolment was seven students, and the founding principal was Mrs. Anula Udalagama.

References

Girls' schools in Sri Lanka
Schools in Kegalle